Antispila mesogramma is a moth of the family Heliozelidae. It was described by Edward Meyrick in 1921. It is found in Peru.

References

Moths described in 1921
Heliozelidae